Ransford Koufie (born 21 August 2002) is a Ghanaian footballer who currently plays as a midfielder for Golden Kick.

Career statistics

Club

Notes

References

2002 births
Living people
Ghanaian footballers
Ghana youth international footballers
Association football midfielders
Ghana Premier League players
International Allies F.C. players